Charles Price Jones Sr. (December 9, 1865 – January 19, 1949) was an American religious leader and hymnist. He was the founder of the Church of Christ (Holiness) U.S.A.

Life
Jones was born in Floyd County, Georgia.  He became a missionary Baptist preacher in Jackson, Mississippi, where he met Charles Harrison Mason in 1895. In 1896, Jones, Mason, and two other preachers held a faith healing revival in Jackson. The theory of entire sanctification as taught by the Wesleyan-Holiness movement was not accepted by Baptists congregation, as Baptist hold to a progressive sanctification. In 1897, Jones and Mason left their congregations and adopted the views of the Wesleyans. They started their own church, first preaching in supporters' homes and eventually in a former gin house.

Jones is the author of over 1000 hymns.  Some of his known hymns which are still sung around the world are Deeper, Deeper; I Will Make the Darkness Light; Come Unto Me; Where Shall I Be; I'm Happy With Jesus Alone; and Jesus Only.  He pastored churches in Arkansas, Mississippi, and California.

In 1907, there was a separation with Charles Mason and other ministers who returned from the Azusa Street Revival in Los Angeles led by William Joseph Seymour over the biblical interpretation of speaking in tongues as an evidence of the baptism in the Holy Spirit. Mason carried the church name and approximately half of its congregation into Pentecostalism.

In 1909, the Christian Women Willing Workers (CWWW), now the United Christian Women's Ministries (UCWM) was established upon the recommendation of Sis. Maria Williams. Jones made his first trip to Los Angeles in 1915 to conduct a revival for Bishop William A. Washington and helped him organize and incorporate the Bethel Church of Christ (Holiness) U.S.A.

In 1915, Elder Charles Mason, who became Bishop Charles Mason, incorporated the Church of God in Christ which he founded. Conflicts caused the holiness movement to separate into many denominations. It was first called 'the movement', and later Church of God, Church of Christ, Church of God in Christ, and Church of Christ (Holiness) U.S.A.

In 1916, Bishop Jones wife Fannie Brown died in Little Rock, Arkansas. He moved to Los Angeles in 1917 and organized Christ Temple Church of Christ (Holiness) U.S.A. in an upstairs hall at Washington and Central. Jones married Pearl E. Reed on January 4, 1918, to this union three sons were born, Charles Price Jones Jr., Vance Reed Jones and Samuel Sherman Jones. In 1921, the first property bought for Christ Temple was on 37th and Naomi. Then in 1926, a church and parsonage was purchased for $18,000 on the corner of 54th and Hooper.

In 1922 the church created a council of Bishops in the national convocation and he was chosen to be the first Senior Bishop. He actively maintained the spiritual leadership and operated as Senior Bishop of the church until he fell ill in 1943 and underwent major surgery. Because of his declining health, he attended his last convention in 1944 in Chicago, Illinois, where he was elected Senior Bishop and President Emeritus of the National Convention for life. Jones died in Los Angeles on January 19, 1949: his homegoing service was held at Christ Temple Church (54th and Hooper) on January 25, 1949, at 1:00pm. He is buried with his wife Pearl, who died on August 13, 1972, at Evergreen Cemetery, Los Angeles. He was succeeded by Bishop Major Rudd Conic who in 1967 relocated Christ Temple Church to its current location on 54th and 10th Ave.

References

External links
Charles Price Jones biography at BlackHistoryReview.com
Hymns of Charles Price Jones

1865 births
1949 deaths
American bishops
African-American Christian clergy
American Christian clergy
People from Floyd County, Georgia
Churches of God Christians
Burials at Evergreen Cemetery, Los Angeles
20th-century African-American people